Argyle is a provincial electoral district in Nova Scotia, Canada which existed between 1981 and 2013 and since 2021.  It elects one member of the Nova Scotia House of Assembly.  It was created in 1981 when the district of Yarmouth was split into two separate districts. The district comprises most of the Municipality of the District of Argyle, an Acadian area occupying the eastern half of Yarmouth County.

The electoral district was abolished following the 2012 electoral boundary review and was largely replaced by the new electoral district of Argyle-Barrington. It was re-created following the 2019 electoral boundary review out of Argyle-Barrington.

Geography
The riding of Argyle has  of landmass.

Members of the Legislative Assembly
The electoral district was represented by the following Members of the Legislative Assembly:

Election results

2021 general election

2017 general election (transposed)

2009 general election

2006 general election

2003 general election

1999 general election

1998 general election

1993 general election

1988 general election

1984 general election

1981 general election

References

Former provincial electoral districts of Nova Scotia